The John Butters Power Station is a conventional hydroelectric power station located in Western Tasmania, Australia. The power station forms part of the KingYolande River Power Scheme and is owned and operated by Hydro Tasmania.

Technical details
Part of the KingYolande scheme that comprises three hydroelectric power stations, the John Butters Power Station is fed by water from Lake Burbury which is dammed by the Crotty Dam in the gap in the West Coast Range between Mount Jukes and Mount Huxley, and to the south by Darwin Dam. Water flow to the station is via a long headrace tunnel from the Crotty Dam via a -long headrace tunnel and a -long steel lined power tunnel.

The power station was commissioned in 1992 by the Hydro-Electric Corporation, one of the last power stations constructed before its disaggregation and transformation to Hydro Tasmania. Within the station building, the turbine has a half embedded spiral casing controlled via a spherical rotary inlet valve and a vertical lift, gravity closed intake gate designed to cut off full flow. The station output, estimated to be  annually, is fed to TasNetworks' transmission grid via a 13.8 kV/220 kV three-phase Fuji generator transformer to the outdoor switchyard.

The station is remotely controlled from the Sheffield Control Centre.

Etymology
The power station was named in honour of John Butters, the first general manager and chief engineer of Hydro Tasmania.

When the King power scheme was approved by the Tasmanian Government the name on hydro plans for the proposed power station at that time was the Newall Power station.

See also

List of power stations in Tasmania

References

Hydroelectric power stations in Tasmania
West Coast Range
Energy infrastructure completed in 1992
King River power development scheme